Martina Hingis defeated Venus Williams in the final, 6–0, 6–4 to win the women's singles tennis title at the 1997 US Open. She did not drop a set during the tournament. By reaching the final, Hingis became the seventh woman, (after Maureen Connolly, Margaret Court, Chris Evert, Martina Navratilova, Steffi Graf, and Monica Seles) to reach all four major singles finals in a calendar year. She also became the youngest woman to reach each major final, and the youngest woman to win three majors in a calendar year. Williams was the first unseeded player in the Open Era to reach the final.

Steffi Graf was the two-time reigning champion, but withdrew due to injury.

Seeds

Qualifying

Draw

Finals

Top half

Section 1

Section 2

Section 3

Section 4

Bottom half

Section 5

Section 6

Section 7

Section 8

External links
1997 US Open – Women's draws and results at the International Tennis Federation

Women's Singles
US Open (tennis) by year – Women's singles
1997 in women's tennis
1997 in American women's sports